Thomas Corbyn (fl. 1410s) was the member of Parliament for Malmesbury for the parliaments of March 1416 and 1417.

References 

Members of the Parliament of England for Malmesbury
English MPs March 1416
Year of birth unknown
Year of death unknown
English MPs 1417